Ampedini is a tribe of click beetles in the family Elateridae. There are about 7 genera and at least 80 described species in Ampedini.

Genera
These seven genera belong to the tribe Ampedini:
 Ampedus Dejean, 1833 g b
 Anchastus LeConte, 1853 i c g b
 Blauta Leconte, 1854 b
 Dicrepidius Eschscholtz in Thon, 1829 g b
 Dipropus Germar, 1839 g b
 Melanotus Erichson, 1829 i c g b
 Physorhinus Germar, 1840 g b
Data sources: i = ITIS, c = Catalogue of Life, g = GBIF, b = Bugguide.net

References

Further reading

External links

 

Elateridae